Da Várzea River may refer to:

Da Várzea River (Iguazu River)
Da Várzea River (Negro River)
Da Várzea River (Rio Grande do Sul)